The Granite Way is a route of 18 km (11 miles) consisting mainly of a motor traffic-free cycle/walkway between Okehampton (near the railway station) and Lydford. It was built by Devon County Council (DCC) and is part of the National Cycle Network (NCN) Route 27 ‘Devon Coast to Coast’ between Ilfracombe and Plymouth.  It is maintained jointly by DCC and Sustrans. Currently, the Way is supported by a Sunday-only train service during summer months to and from Okehampton railway station providing links to nearby Exeter run by DCC and Great Western Railway.

The Granite Way largely follows the course of the former Southern Region railway line.  The route includes notable features such as crossing the Meldon Viaduct and Lake Viaduct both of which were formerly railway bridges and are of historical interest.  The Granite Way featured in Five of the best scenic bike rides in Devon.

Much of the Way is within Dartmoor National Park.

See also 
 Rail trail

External links
 The Granite Way Cycle Trail – Dartmoor Tourism

References

Cycleways in England
Footpaths in Devon
Rail trails in England